Special Agent is a 1935 American drama film directed by William Keighley and starring Bette Davis and George Brent. The screenplay by Laird Doyle and Abem Finkel is based on a story by Martin Mooney.  The film was produced by Cosmopolitan Productions and released by Warner Bros.

Plot
The federal government seeks to imprison gangsters due to their financial crimes, tax evasion and violations of Internal Revenue Service regulations. Newspaper reporter Bill Bradford is deputized as a treasury agent by the Internal Revenue Bureau and assigned to find enough evidence to charge gangster Alexander Carston (who has the same initials as Al Capone) with tax evasion.

He learns that Carston's ledgers are kept in a code known only to his secretary, Julie Gardner. When she witnesses the murder of a man who double-crossed her boss, Bill begs her to quit her job, but Julie realizes she knows too much for Carston to let her go.

District Attorney Roger Quinn pressures the murdered man's partner into testifying, but Carston learns of the plan and the witness is murdered and Carston is acquitted. Julie is arrested as a material witness and decodes the books, but is kidnapped by Carston's henchmen before she can testify. Bill tricks Carston into taking him where Julie is being held, and the police trail them. A shootout follows and Julie is rescued. Her testimony sends Carston to Alcatraz, and she accepts Bill's marriage proposal.

Cast
 Bette Davis as Julie Gardner 
 George Brent as Bill Bradford 
 Ricardo Cortez as Alexander Carston
 Jack La Rue as Jake Andrews (as Jack LaRue)
 Henry O'Neill as District Attorney Roger Quinn
 Robert Strange as Waxey Armitage
 Joseph Crehan as Commissioner of Police
 J. Carrol Naish as Joe Durell (as J. Carroll Naish)
 Joe Sawyer as Rich (as Joseph Sauers)
 William B. Davidson as Charlie Young (as William Davidson)
 Robert Barrat as Chief of Internal Revenue Service
 Paul Guilfoyle as Williams
 Joe King as Agent Wilson (as Joseph King)
 Irving Pichel as U.S. District Attorney
 Charles Middleton as State Police Commander

Production notes
Special Agent was one of three 1935 films co-starring Bette Davis and George Brent, who appeared on-screen together a total of thirteen times. Neither was happy with the finished product. Brent told Ruth Waterbury of Photoplay that the picture was "a poor, paltry thing, unbelievable and unconvincing." At the behest of the Warner Bros. publicity department, his comments remained unpublished. The film, featuring a law enforcement officer triumphing over gangsters was released by Warners in the same year as G Men.

The film was made just after the Hays Office started to enforce the Production Code. They insisted on several minor changes and wanted a scene producer Sam Bischoff felt was crucial to the plot to be cut in its entirety. The censors compromised by allowing it to remain intact but without what they considered offensive dialogue. As a result, Ricardo Cortez' lips can be seen moving but nothing is heard on the soundtrack.

The Oscar-winning song "Lullaby of Broadway" by Harry Warren and Al Dubin is heard in the background in a scene set in a casino. The tune was introduced by Wini Shaw that same year in the musical film Gold Diggers of 1935, also a Warner Bros. release.

New York newspaperman Martin Mooney's story also served as the basis of the 1940 Warner Bros. release Gambling on the High Seas. Mooney provide the story for the following year's Bullets or Ballots and Exclusive Story as well as authoring the book Crime Incorporated (1935).

Reception
The New York Times called the film a "crisp, fast moving and thoroughly entertaining melodrama" and "a wild and woolly gangland saga", adding, "It all has been done before, but somehow it never seems to lose its visual excitement."

Radio adaptation
Special Agent was presented on Warner Brothers Academy Theater April 24, 1938. Carole Landis and John Ridgely starred in the 30-minute adaptation.

References

External links
 
 
 
 

1935 films
1935 crime drama films
American black-and-white films
American crime drama films
1930s English-language films
Films about journalists
Films directed by William Keighley
Films produced by Samuel Bischoff
Warner Bros. films
1930s American films
Films scored by Bernhard Kaun